Anacithara lita is a species of sea snail, a marine gastropod mollusk in the family Horaiclavidae.

Description
(Original description) The length of the shell attains 4 mm, its diameter 1.5 mm. This is a small plain shell of simple character. The whorls are six; the lower ones ventricose, the two apical swollen, smooth and shining. 
Obtuse and thick ribs, longitudinally, ornament the shell, and these are spirally crossed by many conspicuous lirae. The aperture is widely ovate. The outer lip is slightly thickened. The shell is whitish. The aperture is brown within. The columellar margin is plain. Likewise the sinus on the outer lip is inconspicuous, small and rounded.

Distribution
This marine species occurs off the Loyalty Islands and Vanuatu.

References

External links
  Tucker, J.K. 2004 Catalog of recent and fossil turrids (Mollusca: Gastropoda). Zootaxa 682:1–1295.
 Specimen at MNHN, Paris

lita
Gastropods described in 1896